For Better or For Worse is a 1993 American documentary film produced by David Collier. It was nominated for an Academy Award for Best Documentary Feature. It also aired as an episode of the PBS series POV.

Synopsis
The film explores the lives and relationships of five couples married for fifty years or longer. The couples discuss the issues that inform every long-term relationship. They recount stories of their shared journeys, from living room jazz jam sessions, to the Gay Pride parade in New York, to the backwoods of Northern California.

References

External links

For Better or For Worse at POV
For Better or For Worse at Studio B Films, founded by David Collier

1993 films
1993 documentary films
American documentary films
1990s English-language films
1990s American films